Rodger Boyce is an American character actor who has appeared in more than a dozen feature films, including Best Picture Oscar winner No Country for Old Men  one of three films he has done with Tommy Lee Jones (the others including The Three Burials of Melquiades Estrada and The Good Old Boys).  Other notable feature film appearances include Where the Heart Is, A Perfect World and Lone Star State of Mind.  He has also appeared in some 25 made-for-television movies.  In addition, his television work has included episodic appearances in TV series ranging from Dallas, Dangerous Curves and The Big Easy to Walker, Texas Ranger, Roughriders, The Good Guys and even Wishbone.  Rodger began his acting career in theater, and he has occasionally returned to the stage, appearing in summer stock and regional theater productions.  A graduate of Texas Tech University where he majored in journalism and English, Rodger is a native Texan and former newspaper reporter and editor, and for a number of years was a community college teacher and administrator.  He and his wife Juddi, a professional counselor/therapist, live in Gainesville, Texas.

Filmography

External links

References 

Year of birth missing (living people)
Living people
Male actors from Texas
American male television actors